The Liaison of Independents (Trikala Prefecture) was a political party in Greece in the 1920s.

History
The party first contested national elections in 1926, when they won a single seat in the parliamentary elections with 0.4% of the national vote. However, the party did not contest any further elections.

References

Defunct political parties in Greece
Trikala (regional unit)